Talis renetae is a moth in the family Crambidae. It is found in Turkey.

References

Ancylolomiini
Moths described in 1984
Moths of Asia